The 2010 Men's Hockey World Cup was the 12th edition of Men's Hockey World Cup, the quadrennial world championship for men's national field hockey teams organized by the International Hockey Federation. It was held from 28 February to 13 March 2010 in New Delhi, India.

Australia won the tournament after defeating Germany 2–1 in the final, collecting their second World Cup, after the title obtained in 1986. The Netherlands won the third-place match by defeating England 4–3.

Background
India's hosting of the event was put in doubt when the FIH reviewed the progress of the Indian Hockey Federation's "Promoting Indian Hockey" program and India's preparation for the championship, and warned that "satisfactory progress had not been made in either area". India was warned it could lose the right to host the World Cup unless satisfactory progress was made. It was confirmed on 18 July 2008 that the International Hockey Federation formally awarded the hosting rights to India.

Qualification
Each of the continental champions from five confederations and the host nation received an automatic berth. The European confederation received three extra quotas based upon the FIH World Rankings at the completion of the 2008 Summer Olympics. In addition to the three winners of each of the three Qualifiers, the following twelve teams, shown with final pre-tournament rankings, competed in this tournament.

Competition format
Twelve teams competed in the tournament with the competition consisting of two rounds. In the first round, teams were divided into two pools of six teams, and play followed round robin format with each of the teams playing all other teams in the pool once.  Teams were awarded three points for a win, one point for a draw and zero points for a loss. At the end of the pool matches, teams were ranked in their pool according to the following criteria in order:
Total points accumulated
Number of matches won
Goal difference
Goals for
The result of the match played between the teams in question

Following the completion of the pool games, teams placing first and second in each pool advanced to a single elimination round consisting of two semifinal games, a third place playoff and a final. Remaining teams competed in classification matches to determine their ranking in the tournament. During these matches, extra time of 7½ minutes per half was to be played if teams were tied at the end of regulation time. During extra time, play followed golden goal rules with the first team to score declared the winner. If no goals were scored during extra time, a penalty stroke competition was to take place.

Umpires
16 umpires were appointed by the FIH for this tournament. During each match, a video umpire was used to assist the on-field umpires in determining if a goal had been legally scored. The FIH also mandated that on a trial basis during the tournament, each team received the right to refer one decision made by an on-field umpire to the video umpire for assessment. Referrals were only permitted for decisions made within the 23 meter area relating to the award (or non-award) of goals, penalty strokes, and penalty corners. In the event that the referral was upheld, the referring team retained a right of further referral.

Christian Blasch (GER)
Ged Curran (SCO)
David Gentles (AUS)
Colin Hutchinson (IRL)
Hamish Jamson (ENG)
Kim Hong-lae (KOR)
Satinder Kumar (IND)
Andy Mair (SCO)
Raghu Prasad (IND)
Tim Pullman (AUS)
Marcelo Servetto (ESP)
Gary Simmonds (RSA)
Amarjit Singh (MAS)
Simon Taylor (NZL)
Roel van Eert (NED)
John Wright (RSA)

Squads

Results
All times are Indian Standard Time (UTC+05:30)

First round

Pool A

Pool B

Fifth to twelfth place classification

Eleventh and twelfth place

Ninth and tenth place

Seventh and eighth place

Fifth and sixth place

First to fourth place classification

Semi-finals

Third and fourth place

Final

Awards

Statistics

Final standings

Goalscorers

References

External links
Official FIH website

 
Men's Hockey World Cup
World Cup
International field hockey competitions hosted by India
Hockey World Cup Men
Hockey World Cup Men
Hockey World Cup Men
Sport in New Delhi